Michael James Devlin (born 3 October 1993) is a Scottish professional footballer who plays as a centre-back for Hibernian. He has previously played for Hamilton Academical, Stenhousemuir, Aberdeen and Fleetwood Town. He was selected for Scotland three times in 2019.

Club career

Early career
Born in Motherwell, Devlin grew up in a street near to fellow footballer Mark Reynolds and attended the same school, where the older pupil was held up as an example to follow. As a teenager Devlin spent time in the youth systems of Heart of Midlothian, Aberdeen and Celtic, making the squad for a Glasgow Cup final with the latter in May 2010.

Hamilton Academical
He was picked up by Hamilton Academical, with assurances that hard work would result in a swift path to first team football. He made his senior debut for Hamilton in the Scottish Premier League on 15 January 2011, aged 16, in a 0–4 defeat away at Rangers; the performance of Devlin and other young players in that match, including Lee Kilday who also made his debut, was praised by manager Billy Reid.

He signed on loan for Stenhousemuir on 16 March 2011, and re-joined the Warriors on an emergency loan in February 2012, at the same time signing a two-year contract extension with Hamilton.

He scored his first goal for the Accies in the Scottish Cup in December 2012. In February 2014, he signed a contract extension until the end of the 2014–15 season.

In August 2016 he was appointed the club's new captain. In May 2017, he was involved in an altercation with a fan following a 1–0 home Lanarkshire derby defeat to relegation rivals Motherwell. In the last regular game of the 2016–17 season, Devlin suffered a serious knee injury, meaning he missed the club's two relegation play-off matches.

Aberdeen
Devlin moved to Aberdeen in January 2018 for an undisclosed fee, despite having not yet fully recovered from the knee injury suffered in May 2017. He eventually made his competitive debut for Aberdeen on 26 July 2018, in the first leg of a Europa League tie against Burnley at Pittodrie Stadium.

In August 2020 he was one of eight Aberdeen players who received a suspended three-match ban from the Scottish FA after they breached coronavirus-related restrictions by visiting a bar earlier in the month. He missed most of the 2020–21 season due to hamstring and ankle ligament injuries, and agreed new short-term contracts during 2021–22 with it being anticipated that he would eventually return to full fitness, but by April 2022 he had yet to be named in a matchday squad, and it was initially announced that he would leave Aberdeen at the end of the season but soon clarified that this would be immediate.

Fleetwood Town
Devlin trained with English club Fleetwood Town, managed by his former Aberdeen teammate Scott Brown, in June 2022. He signed a short term contract with Fleetwood in August 2022. He departed the club in January following the expiration of his short-term deal.

Hibernian
After leaving Fleetwood before the end of the January transfer window, Devlin trained with Hibernian. He signed a short-term contract with the club on 13 February 2023.

International career
Devlin was included in the Scotland squad for the first time in October 2018. He was recalled in May 2019, one of five uncapped players to feature. He made his debut on 10 October 2019 in a Euro 2020 qualifier against Russia. He started the game and played the whole match as Scotland lost 0–4.

Career statistics

References

1993 births
Living people
Footballers from Motherwell
Scottish footballers
Scotland international footballers
Association football defenders
Heart of Midlothian F.C. players
Aberdeen F.C. players
Celtic F.C. players
Hamilton Academical F.C. players
Stenhousemuir F.C. players
Fleetwood Town F.C. players
Hibernian F.C. players
Scottish Premier League players
Scottish Football League players
Scottish Professional Football League players
English Football League players
People educated at Our Lady's High School, Motherwell